The Southern Eastern Sudanic, Eastern n Sudanic, En Sudanic or Kir–Abbaian languages form one of two primary divisions of the Eastern Sudanic languages in the classification of Bender (2000). It is rejected as an established group in Starostin (2015).  

The Southern Eastern Sudanic languages are characterized by having an /n/ in the pronoun "I/me", as opposed to the Northern Eastern Sudanic languages, which have a /k/. The best known Southern Eastern Sudanic language group, as well as the largest, is Nilotic, which includes such languages as Maasai.

Southern Eastern Sudanic roots
Bender (1996) offers fifteen possible En Sudanic innovations.

References

M. L. Bender, 2000. "Nilo-Saharan". In Bernd Heine and Derek Nurse, eds., African Languages: An Introduction. Cambridge University Press.

 
Eastern Sudanic languages
Southern Eastern Sudanic